The Champions: North Meets South is a collaborative album between New York-based DJ, DJ Kay Slay and Atlanta-based DJ, Greg Street. The album was released on August 22, 2006, through Koch Records.

Track listing

Charts

References

2006 albums
E1 Music albums
DJ Kay Slay albums
Greg Street (DJ) albums
Albums produced by Juicy J
Collaborative albums